The 2019–20 Azadegan League was the 29th season of the Azadegan League and 19th as the second highest division since its establishment in 1991. The season featured 11 teams from the 2018–19 Azadegan League, two new teams relegated from the 2018–19 Persian Gulf Pro League: Sepidrood and Esteghlal Khuzestan and two new teams promoted from the  2018–19 League 2: Khooshe Talaei Saveh, Arman Gohar Sirjan and Nirooye Zamini as champion, runner-up and third placed team respectively. Damash replaced Karoon Arvand Khorramshahr, while Elmoadab Tabriz replaced Shahrdari Tabriz. Khooneh be Khooneh changed their name into Rayka Babol. The league started on 17 August 2019 and was planned to be ended in April 2020 but in March 2020 it was suspended due to COVID-19 pandemic in Iran until June 2020. After suspension, the league was ended on 16 August 2020.

Teams

Stadia and locations

Number of teams by region

League table

Results

Statistics

Top scorers

See also
 2019–20 Persian Gulf Pro League
 2019–20 2nd Division
 2019-20 3rd Division
 2019–20 Hazfi Cup
 2019 Iranian Super Cup

References

Azadegan League seasons
Iran